The 1967 All-Ireland Under-21 Football Championship was the fourth staging of the All-Ireland Under-21 Football Championship since its establishment by the Gaelic Athletic Association in 1964.

Roscommon entered the championship as the defending champions, however, they were defeated by Mayo in the Connacht final.

On 8 October 1967, Mayo won the championship following a 4-9 to 1-7 defeat of Kerry in a replay of the All-Ireland final. This was their first All-Ireland title.

Results

All-Ireland Under-21 Football Championship

Semi-finals

Finals

Statistics

Miscellaneous

 Derry win the Ulster title for the first time in their history.
 Kildare become the first team to win three successive Leinster titles.
 The All-Ireland final ends in a draw and goes to a replay for the first time.
 J. J. Cribbin, one of the earliest seminarians to receive permission to play football, played for Mayo in the final.

References

1967
All-Ireland Under-21 Football Championship